Verticordia dichroma is a flowering plant in the myrtle family, Myrtaceae and is endemic to the south-west of Western Australia. It is a much-branched shrub with rounded leaves and spikes of scented, deep red and golden-coloured flowers.

Description

Flowering time is from late October to December.

Taxonomy and naming
Verticordia dichroma was first formally described by Alex George in 1991 and the description was published in Nuytsia. The specific epithet (dichroma) "is from the Greek di- (two-) and chroma (colour), in reference to the flowers which are bicoloured when they open."

In the same paper, George described two varieties and the names have been accepted by the Australian Plant Census:
 Verticordia dichroma var. syntoma A.S.George  which has shorter leaves, sepals and petals and fewer flowers per group than the type variety.

George placed this species in subgenus Eperephes, section Pennuligera along with V. comosa, V. lepidophylla, V. chrysostachys, V. aereiflora, V. x eurardyensis, V. muelleriana, V. argentea, V. albida, V. fragrans, V. venusta, V. forrestii, V. serotina, V. oculata, V. etheliana and V. grandis.

Distribution and habitat
Both varieties grow in deep sand, often with other verticordias, in heath and shrubland.
 Subspecies dichroma occurs in the eastern part of Kalbarri National Park, north towards Shark Bay and south to near Northampton, in the Carnarvon, Geraldton Sandplains and Yalgoo biogeographic regions;
 Subspecies syntoma occurs between the lower Murchison River and Shark Bay, in the same biogeographic regions as var. dichroma.

Conservation
Both varieties of V. dichroma are classified as "Priority Three" by the Western Australian Government Department of Parks and Wildlife meaning that they are poorly known and known from only a few locations but are not under imminent threat.

Use in horticulture
Both varieties of V. dichroma are worthy of cultivation in gardens due to their spectacular flowers. They are difficult to propagate from cuttings but once established are hardy plants. They are more difficult to grow in eastern Australia.

References

dichroma
Rosids of Western Australia
Eudicots of Western Australia
Plants described in 1991